A marla is a unit of area used in the Indian subcontinent.

Description

British raj standard marla 

The marla is a traditional unit of area that is used in India, Pakistan and Bangladesh. The marla was standardized under British raj to be equal to the square rod, or 272.25 square feet, 30.25 square yards, or 25.2929 square metres. As such, it was exactly one 160th of an acre.

Differing marla measurements standards in India and Pakistan
The definition of marla varies between India and Pakistan. In India, the unit was standardized to 25 square yards. Its use in India is in decline, with the guz, square meter, acre and hectare being the more commonly used units. Bangladesh uses the same definition of marla as in India. In most of Pakistan, it is still equal to the British defined 30.25 sq yards,  The old British definition of marla is often referred to as a "big marla" in India.

Indian marla 
The units of measurement for marla in India, specially Haryana and Punjab, are:

  Marla
 – 1(Karm)   = 5.5 Ft
 – 1(Sarsahi)=5.5 Ft x 5.5 Ft = 30.25 Sq.Ft.
 – 1 Marla = 9 Sarsahi = 30.25 x 9 = 272.25 Sq.Ft. (1 Marla)

Pakistani marla 
Costs vary from time to time but the average plot size conversion stays the same.
 Original Marla
 – 1(Karm/Sarsai)   = 5.5 Ft OR 5.5 x 5.5 = 30.25 Sq/Ft
 – 9(Karm/Sarsai)in 1 Marla = 30.25 x 9 = 272.25 Sq/Ft (1-Marla)

Conversion table for British raj Marla to Indian and Pakistani standards

See also
 Kanal (unit)

References

Units of area
Customary units in India
Housing in Pakistan